An addictive personality refers to a hypothesized set of personality traits that make an individual predisposed to developing addictions. This hypothesis states that there may be common personality traits observable in people suffering from addiction; however, the lack of a universally agreed upon definition has marked the research surrounding addictive personality. Addiction is a fairly broad term; it is most often associated with substance use disorders, but it can also be extended to cover a number of other compulsive behaviors, including sex, internet, television, gambling, food, and shopping. Within these categories of addiction a common diagnostic scale involves tolerance, withdraw, and cravings. This is a fairly contentious topic, with many experts suggesting the term be retired due to a lack of cumulative evidence supporting the existence of addictive personality. Stating that characteristics of personality attributed to addictive personality do not predict addiction, but can result from addiction. However, different personality traits have been linked to various types of addictive behaviors, suggesting that individual addictions may be associated with different personality profiles. The strongest consensus is that genetic factors play the largest role in determining a predisposition for addictive behaviors. Even then, however, genes play different roles in different types of addictions. Forty to seventy percent of the population variance in the expression of addictions can be explained by genetic factors.

Etiology
The following factors are believed to influence addiction susceptibility.

Psychological factors

Impulsivity
Sensation seeking
Nonconformity combined with weak commitment to socially valued goals for achievement	 
Social alienation and tolerance for deviance	 
Heightened stress coupled with lack of coping skills.	 
		 
Some claim the existence of "addictive beliefs" in people more likely to develop addictions, such as "I cannot make an impact on my world" or "I am not good enough", which may lead to developing traits associated with addiction, such as depression and emotional insecurity.   People who strongly believe that they control their own lives and are mostly self-reliant in learning information (rather than relying on others) are less likely to become addicted. However, it is unclear whether these traits are causes, results or merely associated coincidentally. For example, depression due to physical disease can cause feelings of hopelessness that are mitigated after successful treatment of the underlying condition, and addiction can increase dependence on others. Certain psychological disorders such as panic attacks, depressive disorders, and generalized anxiety disorder have been related to addiction. The addict, who struggles with reality and feels negative feelings, such as anxiety and depression, will seek out ways to help them avoid such feelings.

Food addiction 
Overeating due to food addiction has not yet been recognized as a medical disorder under the Diagnostic and Statistical Manual of Mental Disorders despite its prevalence in the general population. A study based on social cognitive theories, included a personality-targeted intervention that was shown to help treat substance addiction. It is feasible that by changing certain elements of one's personality, one can gain a step in the right direction towards changing their addictive personality.

Genetic factors 
According to David Goldman, a prominent alcoholism researcher,  addiction is one of the behavioral disorders most strongly correlated with genetic makeup. Individual traits can share common underlying factors or interact. For example, depression, poor self-control, and compulsive behavior are linked to neurotransmitter abnormalities, i.e., biological mechanisms.  In laboratory studies with rats only some rats develop a pattern of self-administration of stimulant drugs, supporting the existence of some inherent propensity for addictive tendencies. In these rats, a positive correlation was found between locomotor response to novel stimuli and the amount of amphetamine self-administered during the first few days of testing. Twin and adoption studies have shown genetic factors account for 50–60% of the risk for alcoholism. In early adolescence, social and familial factors play a more important role in the initiation of drug use but their importance fades with progression into adulthood. The gene CHRNA5 has been heavily linked to the addictions of cigarettes. Researchers discovered that the CHRNA5 variant creates a less nauseating experience for a first time smoker. The gene is active in the region of the brain called the Habenula. Research showed that frequent smoking might damage the neurons within the Habenula that inhibit its role in aversion and avoidance which might cause the smoker to then use more nicotine to feel relief from resulting distressful and negative feelings.

Environmental factors 
Studies have found numerous environmental factors that correlate with addiction. Exposure to sustained stress in childhood, such as physical or sexual abuse, especially accompanied by unpredictable parental behavior strongly correlates with drug addiction and overeating in adulthood. Children who tend to react to distress in a more rash way have been linked to becoming more likely to drink and smoke in their adolescence. Results from this research found that this was because the reaction to distress affected psychosocial learning, which led to increased expectancy to drink or smoke. A lack of social interaction has also been shown to correlate with addictive tendencies; rats reared in isolation were quicker to develop a pattern of cocaine self-administration than rats reared in groups. There is a gene/environment connection in that individuals with particular personality traits may self-select into different environments, e.g., they may seek out work environments where addictive substances are more readily available.

Description
Addiction can be defined as an excessive amount of time and resources spent in engaging in an activity or an experience that somehow affects the person's quality of life. An addictive personality is when those addictive behaviors progress and change as the individual seeks to produce the desired mood.

People that face this issue are currently defined to have a brain disease as promoted by the National Institute on Drug Abuse and other authorities. People who experience addictive personality disorders typically act on impulses and cannot deal with delayed gratification. At the same time, people with this type of personality tend to believe that they do not fit into societal norms and therefore, acting on impulses, deviate from conformity to rebel. People with addictive personalities are very sensitive to emotional stress. They have trouble handling situations that they deem frustrating, even if the event is for a very short duration. The combination of low self-esteem, impulsivity and low tolerance for stress causes these individuals to have frequent mood swings and often suffer from some sort of depression. A coping mechanism to deal with their conflicting personality becomes their addiction and the addiction acts as something that the person can control when they find it difficult to control their personality traits.

People with addictive personalities typically switch from one addiction to the next. These individuals may show impulsive behavior such as excessive caffeine consumption, Internet use, eating chocolate or other sugar-laden foods, television watching, or even running.

Extraversion, self-monitoring, and loneliness are also common characteristics found in those who suffer from addiction. Individuals who score high on self-monitoring are more prone to developing an addiction.  High self-monitors are sensitive to social situations; they act how they think others expect them to act. They wish to fit in, hence they are very easily influenced by others.  Likewise, those who have low self-esteem also seek peer approval; therefore, they participate in "attractive" activities such as smoking or drinking to try to fit in.

People with addictive personalities find it difficult to manage their stress levels. In fact, lack of stress tolerance is a telltale sign of the disorder. They find it difficult to face stressful situations and fight hard to get out of such conditions.  Long-term goals prove difficult to achieve because people with addictive personalities usually focus on the stress that comes with getting through the short-term goals. Such personalities will often switch to other enjoyable activities the moment that they are deprived of enjoyment in their previous addiction.

Addictive individuals feel highly insecure when it comes to relationships. They may often find it difficult to make commitments in relationships or trust their beloved because of the difficulty they find in achieving long-term goals. They constantly seek approval of others and as a result, these misunderstandings may contribute to the destruction of relationships. People suffering from addictive personality disorder usually undergo depression and anxiety, managing their emotions by developing addiction to alcohol, other types of drugs, or other pleasurable activities.

An addict is more prone to depression, anxiety, and anger. Both the addict's environment, genetics and biological tendency contribute to their addiction. People with very severe personality disorders are more likely to become addicts. Addictive substances usually stop primary and secondary neuroses, meaning people with personality disorders like the relief from their pain.

Personality traits and addiction
Addiction is defined by scholars as "a biopsychosocial disorder characterized by persistent use of drugs (including alcohol) despite substantial harm and adverse consequences". Substance-based addictions are those based upon the release of dopamine in the brain, upon which the range of sensations produced by the euphoric event in the brain changes the brain's immediate behavior, causing more susceptibility for future addictions. Behavior-based addictions, on the other hand, are those that are not linked to neurological behavior as much and are thus thought to be linked to personality traits; it is this type of addiction that combines a behavior with a mental state and the repeated routine is therefore associated with the mental state.

Drug addiction 
A group of British forensic psychologists and data scientists analysed a new large database of users of psychoactive substances. To analyse the predisposition to drug use, they utilized 7 psychological traits, the Five Factor Model supplemented by Impulsivity and Sensation seeking:

N Neuroticism  is a long-term tendency to experience negative emotions such as nervousness, tension, anxiety and depression (associated adjectives: anxious, self-pitying, tense, touchy, unstable, and worrying);
E Extraversion   is manifested in outgoing, warm, active, assertive, talkative, cheerful characters, often in search of stimulation (associated adjectives: active, assertive, energetic, enthusiastic, outgoing, and talkative);
O Openness to experience  is a general appreciation for art, unusual ideas, and imaginative, creative, unconventional, and wide interests (associated adjectives: artistic, curious, imaginative, insightful, original, and wide interest);
A Agreeableness  is a dimension of interpersonal relations, characterized by altruism, trust, modesty, kindness, compassion and cooperativeness (associated adjectives: appreciative, forgiving, generous, kind, sympathetic, and trusting);
C Conscientiousness is a tendency to be organized and dependable, strong-willed, persistent, reliable, and efficient (associated adjectives: efficient, organized, reliable, responsible, and thorough);
Imp Impulsivity  is defined as a tendency to act without adequate forethought;
SS Sensation Seeking   is  defined by the search for experiences and feelings, that are varied, novel, complex and intense, and by the readiness to take risks for the sake of such experiences.

These factors are not statistically independent but the condition number of the correlation matrix is less than 10 and the multicollinearity effects are not expected to be strong.

The results of the detailed analysis of modern data support partially the hypothesis about psychological predisposition to addiction. The group of users of illicit drugs differs from the group of non-users for N, O, A, C, Imp, and SS. Symbolically, this difference can be illustrated as follows:

(N, O, Imp, and SS scores are higher for users;  A and C scores are lower for users).

The hypothesis about importance of E for addiction was not supported by this aggregated analysis of use of all illicit drugs.

Analysis of consumption of different drugs separately demonstrated that predisposition to use of different drugs is different. For all illicit drugs groups of their users have the following common properties:

(O, Imp, and SS scores are higher for users and C score is lower for users).

Deviation of N, E, and A scores for users of different drugs can be different. For example, heroin users have average profile

whereas for LSD and Ecstasy (the latter being a so-called "Party drug") users N has no significant deviation from the population level and E can be higher.

Several personality profiles of risky behaviour were identified by various researchers, for example  (Insecures) and (Impulsives, Hedonists). Various types of addictive personality have in common low C.

Internet addiction 
Internet addiction is associated with higher scores in neuroticism and lower scores in extraversion and conscientiousness. One explanation for the association with high neuroticism is that virtual environments may be regarded as more safe and comfortable by individuals with lower self-esteem and increased negative emotion (traits associated with high neuroticism) compared to real-life environments. Similarly, individuals with low extraversion that desire social interaction but are averse to face-to-face interaction may find the opportunity for online communication attractive.

Controversy
There is an ongoing debate about the question of whether an addictive personality really exists. The assumption that personality might be to blame for an addicted person, who is in need of rehabilitation due to drug and alcohol addictions, can have great negative impacts from its supporting a homogeneous answer to a heterogeneous issue in question. These people run the risk of being labeled as stigmas and become incorrectly marginalized, and these misjudgments of personality may then lead to poor mental, medical, and social health practices. There are two sides of this argument, each with many levels and variations. One side believes that there are certain traits and dimensions of personality that, if existent in a person, cause the person to be more prone to developing addictions throughout their life. The other side argues that addiction is in chemistry, as in how the brain's synapses respond to neurotransmitters and is therefore not affected by personality. 
A major argument in favor of defining and labeling an addictive personality has to do with the human ability to make decisions and the notion of free will. This argument suggests human beings are aware of their actions and what the consequences of their own actions are and many choose against certain things because of this. This can be seen in that people are not forced to drink excessively or smoke every day, but it is within the reach of their own free will that some may choose to do so. Therefore, those with addictive personalities are high in neuroticism and hence choose to engage in riskier behaviors. 
The theory of addictive personalities agrees that there are two types of people: risk-takers and risk-averse. Risk-takers enjoy challenges, new experiences and want instant gratification. These people enjoy the excitement of danger and trying new things. On the other hand, risk-averse are those who are by nature cautious in what they do and the activities they involve themselves in. It is the personality traits of individuals that combine to create either a risk-taker or risk-averse person.

Another important concern is the lack of evidence supporting the addictive personality label and the possibility of stigma. While there is a medical consensus surrounding the genetic components of addiction, there is no such consensus supporting the idea that specific personality types have a tendency towards addictive behaviors. In fact, continued use of this term in the absence of clear evidence could be damaging to the people who believe they have an addictive personality.

References

External links
 "Addiction/Addictive Personality." N.p., 6 April 2001. Rpt. in Encyclopedia of Psychology. BNET. Web. 7 April 2010.
 Benedict-Mason, Stephen. "The Addictive Personality." Psychology Today. N.p., 14 March 2009. Web. 31 March 2010.
 Engs, Ruth C. "The Addictive Process and Addictive Behaviors." Addictive Behaviors. N.p., n.d. Web. 31 March 2010.

Personality disorders

Addiction